Mortons of Horncastle Ltd is a publishing, events and printing company based in Horncastle in East Lindsey, Lincolnshire, England.

History
At the age of 21, William Kirkham Morton introduced mechanical typesetting to the small market-town of Horncastle, Lincolnshire, when he founded Mortons of Horncastle. He started the Horncastle News in 1887. The company eventually collapsed after Morton's death in 1935, but the bankrupt remains were bought by Market Rasen journalist Charles Edward Sharpe in the late 1950s. He consolidated his various assets and Mortons of Horncastle was revived as a printer and publisher of several Lincolnshire regional newspapers.

In 1980 it started the Louth Leader and in 1985, the Skegness News. In 1999, it divided into three separate companies – Mortons Media Group, Mortons Print and Mortons Motorcycle Media.

In February 2001 the company sold its Lincolnshire Independent Newspaper Group to Welland Valley Newspapers to concentrate purely on hobbyist magazine publishing, events and exhibitions and contract printing. Its former titles, and those of the former Lincoln Standard Group, are now owned by Johnston Press.

With its four divisions – publishing, events, print and mailing – its operations now fall under the banner of Mortons Media Group. The company employs around 250 staff and achieved the Investors in People standard in 1997.

Divisions

Mortons Media Group Ltd
Mortons Media Group – a subsidiary company of Mortons of Horncastle – produces a range of hobbyist magazine titles and newspapers, organisers several major exhibitions, offers contract print and mailing services and houses a motorcycle and heritage image and publication archive.

Publishing 
Having been involved in regional newspaper production for more than 40 years, in the mid-1990s Mortons began publishing hobbyist titles with the purchase of motorcycle newspaper Old Bike Mart. The acquisition of several more motorcycle-related titles followed, as did titles covering gardening, traction engines, classic American cars and scooters. Mortons also publishes The Railway Magazine – first produced in 1897, the title celebrated its 120th anniversary in 2017.

Current print publishing portfolio:
 Back Street Heroes
 Classic American
 Classic Bike Guide
 Classic Dirt Bike
 Classic Motorcycle Mechanics
 Classic Racer
 Classic Scooterist
 Fast Bikes
 Heritage Railway
 Kitchen Garden
 Motorcycle Sport & Leisure
 Motor Cycle Monthly
 Old Bike Mart
 On 2 Wheels
 Rail Express
 Railways Illustrated 
 RealClassic
 Scootering
 Steam Days
 The Classic MotorCycle
 The Railway Magazine
 Towpath Talk

Bookazines 
Mortons publishes between 20-25 one-off magazine editions each year known as bookazines. These cover a variety of subjects often linked to major historical events and anniversaries.

Online 
Supporting its printed publication range, Mortons produces various online products and digital platforms including motorcycle news websites MoreBikes and O2W, and Kitchen Garden.

Events 
Mortons organises and promotes more than 30 individual events:

 'Normous Newark Autojumble, Newark Showground (x 10)
 The Kempton Park Motorcycle Autojumbles, Kempton Park racecourse (x 7)
 The Carole Nash Classic Bike Guide Winter Classic, Newark Showground
 The Carole Nash Bristol Classic MotorCycle Show, Bath and West Showground
 The Footman James Great Western Classic Car Show, Bath and West Showground
 The Classic Dirt Bike Show Sponsored by Hagon Shocks, Telford International Centre
 The Carole Nash International Classic MotorCycle Show, Staffordshire County Showground
 The Footman James Bristol Classic Car Show, Bath and West Showground
 The Carole Nash Eurojumble, Netley Marsh
 The Carole Nash Classic Mechanics Show, Staffordshire County Showground
 The International Dirt Bike Show in partnership with MOTUL, Staffordshire County Showground
 The Footman James Classic Vehicle Restoration Show, Bath and West Showground

Mortons Print
Printing has been the heartbeat of Mortons since it was founded, and the current company's Print division produces a number of weekly newspapers and one-off/regular of contract jobs. Its printing press was originally housed at the Horncastle News building in the centre of the town, but by 1979 it had outgrown the facility and moved to new premises on Boston Road Industrial Site where Mortons' main HQ still sits today. Mortons Print is a regular entrant at the annual news awards, and in 2016 its work on Fishing News was recognised with the title named Niche Market Newspaper of the Year at a ceremony in London.

Mortons Mailing
In January 2010 Mortons announced the acquisition of Lincolnshire Mailing Company to add capabilities encompassing polywrapping and lettering services to its services. Lincolnshire Mailing Company had been a long-standing supplier to the Mortons Media Group for more than 15 years and had relocated its operation to factory units within the Mortons site in 2004.

Mortons Archive 
Comprising the historical archives of The Motor Cycle and Motor Cycling, Mortons Archive contains more than four million images dating back the earliest days of motorcycle development.

References

External links
 

Companies based in Lincolnshire
Mass media in Lincolnshire
Publishing companies established in 1885
Printing companies of the United Kingdom
Magazine publishing companies of the United Kingdom
Newspaper companies of the United Kingdom
Horncastle
1885 establishments in England